Borislav Nikolov (born 3 February 1992) is a Bulgarian footballer who currently plays as a defender and midfielder for Strumska Slava Radomir.

Career
Nikolov began his club career with CSKA Sofia, but made only one appearance for the senior squad. He played 56 minutes in a 2–0 away league loss against Chernomorets Burgas on 16 May 2010.

In June 2011, Nikolov was loaned out to Akademik Sofia.

References

External links
 

1992 births
Living people
Bulgarian footballers
First Professional Football League (Bulgaria) players
Second Professional Football League (Bulgaria) players
PFC CSKA Sofia players
Akademik Sofia players
PFC Marek Dupnitsa players
FC Strumska Slava Radomir players
FC Lokomotiv 1929 Sofia players
Association football defenders